Zephyrarchaea barrettae is a species of spider of the family Archaeidae. The Latin species name was chosen to honor Sarah Barrett, who first discovered assassin spiders in the Stirling Range National Park.

Distribution and habitat 
Zephyrarchaea barrettae is endemic to the South West Region in Western Australia. It has only been found on Talyuberlup Peak.

References

Archaeidae
Spiders described in 2012
Spiders of Australia
Endemic fauna of Australia